Gaidakot may refer to:

Gaudakot, Gulmi, Nepal
Gaidakot, Nawalparasi, Nepal